The Maj. James B. Bailey House (also known as Rest Haven) is a historic home in Gainesville, Florida, United States. It is located at 1121 Northwest 6th Street.  In 1972, it was added to the U.S. National Register of Historic Places.

It was built by Major James B. Bailey, early settler in the area, starting perhaps around 1848.  Bailey, who owned a large area of land within Gainesville, seems likely to have been a force for the move of Alachua County's seat from Newnansville to Gainesville.  The homestead house "remains today as an excellent example of early plantation architecture and the home of one of Gainesville's most important pioneers."

The house was documented by the Historic American Buildings Survey.

References

External links
Alachua County listings at Florida's Office of Cultural and Historical Programs
The Bailey House at Alachua County Department of Growth Management

Gallery

Buildings and structures in Gainesville, Florida
Houses on the National Register of Historic Places in Florida
National Register of Historic Places in Gainesville, Florida
Houses in Alachua County, Florida
Historic American Buildings Survey in Florida
1854 establishments in Florida
Houses completed in 1854